The Aiguille de Rochefort (4,001 m) is a mountain in the Mont Blanc massif in France and Italy. The peak lies on the Rochefort arête between the Dent du Géant and the Grandes Jorasses and is usually climbed during a traverse of the ridge.

The first ascent of the peak was by James Eccles and guides Alphonse and Michel Payot on 14 August 1873.

See also

List of 4000 metre peaks of the Alps

References

External links
 The Aiguille de Rochefort on SummitPost

Alpine four-thousanders
Mountains of the Alps
Mountains of Haute-Savoie
Mountains of Aosta Valley
France–Italy border
International mountains of Europe
Mont Blanc massif